Grenada North is a small suburb in northern Wellington, New Zealand. It is 5 km south of Porirua's city centre, and 13 km north of Wellington's city centre. Its western boundary is formed by State Highway 1 (SH 1N) and Takapu Road. The suburb itself was named after Grenada in the Caribbean, and most streets are named after Caribbean islands.

The Caribbean Avenue Reserve can be accessed from Caribbean Drive.

History 
The suburb was developed by Glendene Developments Ltd in the 1970s so was originally called Glendene, and was expected to join up soon with the suburb of Grenada further south. To meet increased education demand in the Northern suburbs a new Glendene Secondary School was proposed, but by 1980 it was decided that a new co-ed secondary school was not needed and may never be needed. The  site with sports fields in Jamaica Drive developed by the government was leased to the Wellington City Council for use as playing fields, and was later (c1989) sold to the council. The residential area south towards Grenada is only now (c2015) being developed.

Demographics 

Grenada North had a population of 2,286 at the 2018 New Zealand census, an increase of 123 people (5.7%) since the 2013 census, and an increase of 279 people (13.9%) since the 2006 census. There were 726 households. There were 1,137 males and 1,146 females, giving a sex ratio of 0.99 males per female. The median age was 37.9 years (compared with 37.4 years nationally), with 468 people (20.5%) aged under 15 years, 444 (19.4%) aged 15 to 29, 1,122 (49.1%) aged 30 to 64, and 249 (10.9%) aged 65 or older.

Ethnicities were 74.5% European/Pākehā, 11.4% Māori, 7.9% Pacific peoples, 15.5% Asian, and 3.3% other ethnicities (totals add to more than 100% since people could identify with multiple ethnicities).

The proportion of people born overseas was 25.6%, compared with 27.1% nationally.

Although some people objected to giving their religion, 44.9% had no religion, 40.0% were Christian, 3.5% were Hindu, 1.3% were Muslim, 2.4% were Buddhist and 2.6% had other religions.

Of those at least 15 years old, 504 (27.7%) people had a bachelor or higher degree, and 204 (11.2%) people had no formal qualifications. The median income was $43,700, compared with $31,800 nationally. The employment status of those at least 15 was that 1,035 (56.9%) people were employed full-time, 264 (14.5%) were part-time, and 75 (4.1%) were unemployed.

Aerial view

References

Suburbs of Wellington City